Susan Chepkemei (born 25 June 1975 in Komol, West Pokot District) is a Kenyan long-distance runner, who competes in the 10,000 metres and marathon. In 2001, she won the Rotterdam Marathon and came first in the Great North Run, as well as winning the silver medal in the World Half Marathon Championships. She won also won the silver medal at the 2002 Commonwealth Games in the 10,000 m.

Career
Chepkemei competed at the junior race of IAAF World Cross Country Championships in 1990 and 1992, finishing 3rd and 16th, respectively. at the adult level, she attended the long race between 1998 and 2001, the best result being bronze medal in 2000. She made her marathon debut at the 1998 Berlin Marathon and finished second. She won the Parelloop 10K in race in the Netherlands in 1998 and 2000, and also won the Marseille-Cassis Classique Internationale with a course record time in 2000. She won the Tilburg Ten Miles race (10 km for women) three times a row (2001-2003)

On February 25, 2008, the IAAF imposed a competition ban of 1 year on Chepkemei, making the following statement:

"The International Association of Athletics Federations (IAAF) has been informed by Athletics Kenya (AK) that the female athlete, Susan Chepkemei has been found guilty of the following doping violation under IAAF Rules:
Presence of the prohibited substance Salbutamol (S3. Beta-2 Agonists) in her doping control sample (IAAF Rule 32.2a). This doping violation relates to an IAAF out-of-competition doping control conducted on 10.09.07 in Nairobi, KEN."

Chepkemei was given the asthma medication Salbutamol by her doctor after she became pregnant and developed pneumonia; as a result, the ban was reduced to one year. She began her comeback in early 2009.

She is managed by Jos Hermens.

Marathon achievements

References

External links

 Profile MarathonMajors
 Focus on Kenya - Susan Chepkemei

1975 births
Living people
People from West Pokot County
Kenyan female long-distance runners
Kenyan female marathon runners
Doping cases in athletics
Kenyan sportspeople in doping cases
Commonwealth Games medallists in athletics
Commonwealth Games silver medallists for Kenya
Kenyan female cross country runners
Athletes (track and field) at the 2002 Commonwealth Games
Medallists at the 2002 Commonwealth Games